"Not for You" is a song by Pearl Jam from the album Vitalogy. It may also refer to:
"Not for You", song by Red Fang from the album Only Ghosts
Not for You, an album by the band Mower